Moses Lindley Lee (May 29, 1805 – May 19, 1876) was a U.S. Representative from New York.

Born in Minisink, New York, he graduated from Union College in 1827; and from the College of Physicians and Surgeons of Western New York in 1830. He practiced medicine in Fulton, Oswego County, New York. He was Postmaster of Fulton from 1840 to 1844.

He was a member of the New York State Assembly in 1847 (Oswego Co.); and 1848 (Oswego Co., 1st D.).

He was a member of the New York State Senate (20th D.) in 1856 and 1857.

Lee was elected as a Republican to the 36th United States Congress, holding office from March 4, 1859 to March 3, 1861. Afterwards he resumed the practice of medicine in Fulton.

Returning from a visit in the South, he became seriously ill at Petersburg, Virginia, and died there on May 19, 1876. He was buried at the Mount Adnah Cemetery in Fulton.

Sources

1805 births
1876 deaths
Union College (New York) alumni
New York (state) postmasters
Members of the New York State Assembly
New York (state) state senators
New York (state) Whigs
Republican Party members of the United States House of Representatives from New York (state)
People from Minisink, New York
People from Fulton, Oswego County, New York
19th-century American politicians